Jesús Rico (born 11 January 1953) is a Mexican former footballer. He competed in the men's tournament at the 1972 Summer Olympics.

References

External links
 
 
 

1953 births
Living people
Mexican footballers
Mexico international footballers
Olympic footballers of Mexico
Footballers at the 1972 Summer Olympics
Footballers from Mexico City
Association football defenders
Atlético Español footballers
Club Puebla players
Atlante F.C. footballers